Regression or regressions may refer to:

Science
 Marine regression, coastal advance due to falling sea level, the opposite of marine transgression
 Regression (medicine), a characteristic of diseases to express lighter symptoms or less extent (mainly for tumors), without disappearing totally
 Regression (psychology), a defensive reaction to some unaccepted impulses
 Nodal regression, the movement of the nodes of an object in orbit, in the opposite direction to the motion of the object

Statistics
 Regression analysis, a statistical technique for estimating the relationships among variables. There are several types of regression:
 Linear regression
 Simple linear regression
 Logistic regression
 Nonlinear regression
 Nonparametric regression
 Robust regression
 Stepwise regression
 Regression toward the mean, a common statistical phenomenon

Computing
 Software regression, the appearance of a bug which was absent in a previous revision
 Regression testing, a software testing method which seeks to uncover regression bugs

Hypnosis
 Age regression in therapy, a process claiming to retrieve memories
 Past life regression, a process claiming to retrieve memories of previous lives

Other uses
 Infinite regress, a problem in epistemology
 Regression (film), a 2015 horror film directed and written by Alejandro Amenábar, starring Ethan Hawke and Emma Watson
 Regressions (album), 2010 album by Cleric

See also
 Regress (disambiguation)